Swaziland competed in the 2010 Summer Youth Olympics which were held in Singapore from August 14 to August 26, 2010.

Athletics

Note: The athletes who do not have a "Q" next to their Qualification Rank advance to a non-medal ranking final.

Boys
Track and Road Events

Girls
Track and Road Events

Swimming

Girls'

References

External links
Competitors List: Swaziland

You
Nations at the 2010 Summer Youth Olympics
Eswatini at the Youth Olympics